Bradley is a former civil parish, now in the parish of Tushingham-cum-Grindley, Macefen and Bradley, in the Cheshire West and Chester district, and ceremonial county of Cheshire in England. In 2001 it had a population of 61. The main settlement in the parish was the village of Bradley Green. The civil parish was abolished in 2015 to form a new, larger, parish; part of its area was transferred to Malpas parish.

See also

Listed buildings in Bradley, Cheshire

References

Former civil parishes in Cheshire
Cheshire West and Chester
Malpas, Cheshire